HMS E30 was a British E-class submarine built by Armstrong Whitworth, Newcastle upon Tyne. She was laid down on 29 June 1914 and was commissioned in November 1915. HMS E30 was lost in the North Sea, thought to have been mined off Orfordness, Suffolk on 22 November 1916, the minefield was not discovered until 25 November. There were no survivors.

Design
She was powered by two  Vickers eight-cylinder two-stroke diesel engines and two  electric motors.

E30 was armed with a 12-pounder  QF gun mounted forward of the conning tower. She had five 18-inch (450 mm) torpedo tubes, two in the bow, one either side amidships, and one in the stern; a total of 10 torpedoes were carried. E-class submarines had wireless systems with  power ratings; in some submarines, these were later upgraded to  systems by removing a midship torpedo tube. Their maximum design depth was  although in service some reached depths of below . Some submarines contained Fessenden oscillator systems. Her complement was three officers and 28 men.

Service
E30 joined the 11th Submarine Flotilla, based at Blyth, Northumberland on commissioning. From 23 to 28 February 1916 E30 patrolled off Denmark and Norway with the intention of capturing ships carrying iron ore from Norway to Germany, and to attack any German submarines that were escorting the Iron ore ships. No ships at all were seen during the patrol. E30 patrolled in the Kattegat in March 1915, and was damaged by heavy seas on 16 March, while on 18 March she stopped the Norwegian steamer Kong Inge, carrying a mixed cargo to Germany, off Anholt. She put a prize crew aboard Kong Inge and ordered the merchant ship to Leith for examination. On 5 April E30, together with the newly commissioned submarines  and  set out from Blyth with orders to patrol between Denmark and Orkney in the hope of intercepted German submarines. E30s patrol was cut short when she suffered a battery explosion on the morning of 7 April, killing four men and forcing her return to base.

On 15 May 1916, E30 set out for a patrol in the Kattegat, and on 18 June she encountered the German steamer , whose crew abandoned ship after E30 fired a warning shot. E30 fired two torpedoes, which missed, and then sank the steamer with gunfire. On 2 June E30 was returning from a patrol off the coast of Norway when she spotted two British cruisers returning from the Battle of Jutland, which she signalled, but one of them, opened fire on E30 in response. Minotaur claimed to have sunk a submarine, but E30 returned home safely. On 3 July she encountered the Norwegian steamer Prunelle off Lindesnes in southern Norway. E30 fired two warning shots, but was driven away by the Norwegian torpedo boat . Norway raised a protest about the attempt to stop Prunelle, claiming it took place in territorial waters.

References

Bibliography

External links
 'Submarine losses 1904 to present day' - Royal Navy Submarine Museum 

 

British E-class submarines of the Royal Navy
Ships built on the River Tyne
1915 ships
World War I submarines of the United Kingdom
World War I shipwrecks in the North Sea
Royal Navy ship names
Maritime incidents in 1916
Ships sunk by mines
Ships built by Armstrong Whitworth